Greg Penny (born October 12, 1955) is an American record producer, recording engineer, mixing engineer, musician, songwriter and artist best known for his work as a producer for Elton John and k.d. lang.  He is often credited as the "Agent Provocateur" behind the current trend in Immersive Audio mixing in the Dolby Atmos and Sony 360 Reality Audio formats. His Atmos mix of Elton John's "Rocket Man" set the bar for excellence and inspiration among his peers and his work mixing Harry Styles "Fine Line" album in both Atmos and 360RA earned him a Grammy Award nomination in the Best Immersive Album category. 
Greg is the CEO and co-founder of boombox global - guaranteed to blow your mind !

Career
The son of pop singer Sue Thompson and country musician Hank Penny, Penny was familiar with recording studios from a young age.  In 1989, Penny recorded, mixed and produced k.d. lang's Grammy-winning album Absolute Torch and Twang. Penny and k.d. lang collaborated again in 1992 with Ingénue, which won the Grammy Award for Best Female Pop Vocal Performance.

In 1993, Penny produced the first track from Elton John's Duets, which featured vocals by k.d. lang and strings by Arif Mardin.  In 1994, Penny produced Elton John's next studio album Made in England, collaborating with lyricist Bernie Taupin, arranger Paul Buckmaster, and Sir George Martin, who wrote the string and horn section for the song "Latitude".

In 2000, Penny produced Poperetta @ St. Tropez, an electro-pop album he recorded in France with his wife Katia Lempkowicz.  Penny was nominated for a Grammy Award in 2006 for his surround sound mix of Elton John's Honky Château.  He is the president of Flower Records, producing records by Twin Trip and Poperetta.

References

External links
 Complete Discography
 Producer Profile
 Flower Records

Record producers from California
1955 births
Living people
People from Hollywood, Los Angeles